Masudi (also Romanized as Mas‘ūdī) is a village in Darkhoveyn Rural District, in the Central District of Shadegan County, Khuzestan Province, Iran. At the 2006 census, its population was 45, in 7 families.

References 

Populated places in Shadegan County